A monogastric organism has a simple single-chambered stomach (one stomach). Examples of monogastric herbivores are horses and rabbits. Examples of monogastric omnivores include humans, pigs, hamsters and rats. Furthermore, there are monogastric carnivores such as cats. A monogastric organism is comparable to ruminant organisms (which has a four-chambered complex stomach), such as cattle, goats, or sheep.  Herbivores with monogastric digestion can digest cellulose in their diets by way of symbiotic gut bacteria. However, their ability to extract energy from cellulose digestion is less efficient than in ruminants.  

Herbivores digest cellulose by microbial  fermentation. Monogastric herbivores which can digest cellulose nearly as well as ruminants are called hindgut fermenters, while ruminants are called foregut fermenters.  These are subdivided into two groups based on the relative size of various digestive organs in relationship to the rest of the system: colonic fermenters tend to be larger species such as horses and rhinos, and cecal fermenters are smaller animals such as rabbits and rodents. Great apes derive significant amounts of phytanic acid from the hindgut fermentation of plant materials.

Monogastrics cannot digest the fiber molecule cellulose as efficiently as ruminants, though the ability to digest cellulose varies amongst species.

A monogastric digestive system works as soon as the food enters the mouth. Saliva moistens the food and begins the digestive process. (Note that horses have no (or negligible amounts of) amylase in their saliva). After being swallowed, the food passes from the esophagus into the stomach, where stomach acid and enzymes help to break down the food. Bile salts are stored in the gallbladder (note that horses do not have a gallbladder and bile is directly secreted into the small intestine) and secreted once the contents of the stomach have reached the small intestines   where most fats are broken down. The pancreas secretes enzymes and alkali to neutralize the stomach acid.

References

Digestive system
Biology terminology